The 2013 African Volleyball Clubs Champions Championship was the 32nd edition of African's premier club volleyball tournament held in Tripoli, Libya.

Group stage
The draw was held on 18 April 2013.

Pool A

|}

|}

Pool B

|}

|}

Pool C

|}

|}

Pool D

|}

|}

Knockout stage

Quarterfinals

|}

Semifinals

|}

Bronze medal match

|}

Final

|}

Final standing

Awards
MVP:  Noureddine Hfaiedh (CS Sfaxien)
Best Blocker:  Mohamed Salama (Ahly Benghazi)
Best Libero:  Anouer Taouerghi (CS Sfaxien)
Best Receiver:  Saleh Fathi (Espérance de Tunis)
Best Server:  Daniel  (Prisons)
Best Setter:  Mehdi Ben Cheikh (Espérance de Tunis)
Best Spiker:  Fouad Elmaaroug (Ahly Tripoli)
Source: cavb.org, 27.04.2013

References

 Competition page on the African Volleyball Confederation website

External links
 Official African Volleyball Confederation website

2013
African Clubs Championship (volleyball)
African Volleyball Clubs Champions Championship, 2013
2013 African Volleyball Clubs Champions Championship
African Volleyball Clubs Champions Championship